Pittsburgh A To Z is a 2001 documentary created by Rick Sebak about 26 things about the City of Pittsburgh for every letter of the alphabet. Sebak included a larger area than just the city. In addition to the city, they include Somerset County, Fayette County, and Lawrence County. They had no rules about what to include. However, double usage of any letter gave it an added attraction. They skipped the letter H because the historic spelling of Pittsburgh did not include an H during a period of 20 years.

Letters of the alphabet
Arrowheads and Archaeology
Braddock
Confluences
Dormont and Daguerreotype  
Evergreen Hamlet
Fish Sandwiches
Grant Streets
Islands
Historic Spelling of Pittsburgh
Jeeps
Kentuck Knob
Thomas Lipinski
Mancini's
Night Talk
Opera
Plenty of Possibilities
Robert Qualters (Painter)
Rail Trail
Soldiers & Sailors
Tailgating
Ushers
Vinnie's Pizza
Westinghouse in Wilmerding
Xitech
Yinz
Zambelli Fireworks

Bonus features on the DVD
Considering how they did not pick a "P" in the program, they added extra stories from other WQED specials:
Penn Mac from "The Strip Show"
Penn Brewery from "North Side Story"
The Pretzel Shop from "South Side"
Primanti's from "The Strip Show"
PPG Place or PPG Plaza from "Downtown Pittsburgh" and "Thing's We've Made"
Pip's Diner from "Pennsylvania Diners and Other Roadside Restaurants"

See also
Pennsylvania Diners And Other Roadside Restaurants

References

External links

History of Pittsburgh
American documentary films
Documentary films about cities in the United States
Culture of Pittsburgh
Documentary films about Pennsylvania